Coxton is an unincorporated coal town and census-designated place (CDP) in Harlan County, Kentucky, United States. Their post office is closed. The community was listed as a CDP in 2014, so no population figures are available from the 2010 census.

Geography
Coxton is in central Harlan County in the valley of the Clover Fork of the Cumberland River. It is bordered by Blackjoe to the west and Brookside to the east, both unincorporated. Kentucky Route 38 runs along the southern edge of the Coxton CDP, across the Clover Fork from the center of town. KY 38 leads west down the Clover Fork valle  to Harlan, the county seat, and east (upriver)  to Evarts.

Demographics

References

Census-designated places in Harlan County, Kentucky
Census-designated places in Kentucky
Coal towns in Kentucky